Ebbhead is the fourth album of the British EBM group Nitzer Ebb. The album features a continuation of their industrial sound with the inclusion of metal guitars for the first time, notably featured on the single Godhead as well as the Family Man remix. According to the band, the guitar parts featured were samples.

Reception 
The album was met with a mixed to positive review by Allmusic's Ned Raggett, who awarded the album 3 of 5 stars. He credited the album in progressing their sound to feature more melody and the use of traditional song structures as opposed to their earlier sound. Overall, summarizing the album as a mixed affair with notable high points.

Track listing
 "Reasons"  – 4:17
 "Lakeside Drive"  – 3:59
 "I Give to You"  – 5:10
 "Sugar Sweet"  – 3:21
 "DJVD"  – 4:20
 "Time"  – 4:53
 "Ascend"  – 5:19
 "Godhead"  – 4:29
 "Trigger Happy"  – 4:22
 "Family Man" (Remix) - 3:58

Personnel

Nitzer Ebb 

 Bon Harris - Composer
 Douglas McCarthy - Composer, vocals
 Julian Beeston - Drums, percussion

Production/other 
Producers: Alan Wilder, Flood
Engineer: Steve Lyon
Mixing: Alan Wilder and Steve Lyon
Orchestration arrangements: Andrew Poppy (track 3)
Vocal sample: Jerry McCarthy Clemance (track 4)

References

1991 albums
Mute Records albums
Geffen Records albums
Albums produced by Flood (producer)
Nitzer Ebb albums